One-Eye Lake is a freshwater lake in the West Chilcotin area of British Columbia, Canada, situated just east of the community of Kleena Kleene, British Columbia. This pristine lake is a popular lake for fishing, and is serviced by a BC Forest Service campsite on the south side.

The only river flowing into and out of the lake is the Klinaklini River. Just after exiting the lake to the west, it joins up with the McClinchy River.

The lake is named after Chief One-Eye who got his name on account of having only one eye. One-Eye was buried on the north side of the lake in 1911.

References

Lakes of the Chilcotin
Lakes of British Columbia
Range 2 Coast Land District